John Henry Niemeyer (born in Bremen, Germany, 25 June 1839; died 7 December 1932) was a German-born painter who worked in the United States.  He taught drawing at Yale University for over 30 years.

Biography
He came to the United States in 1843 or 1846, residing in Cincinnati. In 1860, he was studying painting in New York City.  From 1866 to 1870, he was in France where he studied in Paris under Jean-Léon Gérôme and Adolphe Yvon at the École des Beaux Arts, in the studio of Louis Jacquesson de la Chevreuse, and also in that of Sebastian Cornu. He received three medals in the government schools of Paris.

After his studies in Europe, he was appointed in 1871 professor of drawing in the Yale School of Fine Arts, where he remained until 1908.  Among his students were Augustus Saint-Gaudens and Frederic Remington.

Works
 "Gutenberg inventing Movable Type" (1862)
 a portrait of Theodore D. Woolsey (1876)
 "The Braid"
 "Where?"
 "Why?" (1880)
 "Sancta Simplicitas" (1882)
He also executed some bas reliefs, among them a large medallion portrait of William M. Hunt (1883) and "Lilith tempting Eve" (1883).

Notes

References

 

1839 births
1932 deaths
19th-century American painters
19th-century American male artists
American male painters
20th-century American painters
Yale University faculty
German emigrants to the United States
20th-century American male artists